Makrysi (Greek: Μακρύσι, before 1927: Σιάλεσι - Sialesi) is a village and a community in the municipality of Megalopoli, Arcadia, Greece. It is situated on a hillside on the left bank of the river Elissonas, at 496 m elevation. It is 3 km northwest of Mallota and 3 km northeast of Megalopoli town centre. The community consists of the villages Makrysi and Kato Makrysi. Kato Makrysi is situated at 450 m elevation. Zacharias Barbitsiotis, an anti-Ottoman insurgent defeated the Turks in Sialesi in the 1780s.

Historical population

See also
List of settlements in Arcadia

References

External links
Arcadia - Makrysi 
 Makrysi on GTP Travel Pages

Megalopolis, Greece
Populated places in Arcadia, Peloponnese